Joseph-Achille Verville (23 January 1887 – 20 November 1937) was a Liberal party member of the House of Commons of Canada. He was born in Sainte-Gertrude, Quebec and became a notary.

Verville attended Nicolete College and Université Laval. He was mayor of Saint-Flavien, Quebec at one time.

He was first elected to Parliament at the Lotbinière riding in the 1925 general election and re-elected in 1926, 1930 and 1935.

Verville died on 20 November 1937 before completing his term in the 18th Canadian Parliament.

References

External links
 

1887 births
1937 deaths
Université Laval alumni
Liberal Party of Canada MPs
Mayors of places in Quebec
Members of the House of Commons of Canada from Quebec